This is a list of Estonian football transfers in the winter transfer window 2012–13 by club. Only transfers in Meistriliiga are included.

Meistriliiga

Flora

In:

 
 

 

Out:

Narva Trans

In: 

Out:

Levadia

In: 

Out:

Tammeka

In: 

Out:

Nõmme Kalju

In: 

Out:

Sillamäe Kalev

In: 

Out:

Kuressaare

In: 

 

 

Out:

Paide Linnameeskond

In: 

Out:

Tallinna Kalev

In: 

Out:

Infonet

In: 

 

Out:

See also
 2013 Esiliiga
 2013 Meistriliiga

References

External links
 Official site of the Estonian Football Association

Football transfers winter 2012–13
transfers
transfers
2012-13